The Blue Ribbon Bacon Festival is an annual festival in Des Moines, Iowa. Founded by members of the Iowa Bacon Board, the festival sold 200 tickets to the first festival in 2008.  Today, the bacon celebration has grown to host approximately 14,000 bacon-lovers in all. Ticket holders can compete in a bacon-eating contest, listen to lectures about bacon, and sample bacon from vendors.  Festival organizers have extended the celebration internationally through the Blue Ribbon Bacon Tour.

Description
For the price of an admission ticket, each attendee has been entitled to a T-shirt, a choice of bacon samples, and a koozie (an insulation-wrapping for a canned beverage, like beer or soda pop). The Festival also has featured lectures about bacon, a bacon-eating contest, and live performances by entertainers.

In 2012, a major change was made from the "all you can eat" bacon, which was included in the ticket price from years earlier, to a pay as you eat price structure. Justification for the added cost was to reduce lines for bacon goods vendors bring in and cook. Vendor Bacon items run $3 to $8 a piece on top of the ticket price.

History
The Blue Ribbon Bacon Festival was founded in 2008 by Brooks Reynolds, an Iowa realtor, on National Pig Day, 1 March 2008.

The Festival attracted 200 people in 2008 and 300 in 2009. The next year, in 2011, the Festival sold all 1,500 tickets in 4 minutes.

Themes

State of Bacon film
In 2013, the Iowa Bacon Board in conjunction with Digital Cuvée, a production company founded by Jason Cook, set out to make a film entitled State of Bacon utilizing the festival as the centerpiece of the story. In the style of Christopher Guest or Sasha Cohen, the film is a mockumentary, utilizing actors to interact in the real world, as a mash-up style to tell each storyline, and overall transport viewers to the wild and crazy world of Bacon Wonderland.

Tour
After having worked at the Festival, some of its entertainers formed the Blue Ribbon Bacon Tour. One of the Tour's regular participants, Heather Lauer, appeared on the 2009 Tour's stop in Pittsburgh; there, for thirty dollars, participants could compete in a bacon-eating contest and (without additional cost) taste bacon-samples from vendors. Before joining this Tour, Lauer had written the book, Bacon: A love story.

References

External links
 Photo Gallery of 2009 festival
 Video highlights of 2010 festival

Bacon
Food and drink festivals in the United States
Tourist attractions in Des Moines, Iowa
Festivals in Iowa